Buire-Courcelles is a commune in the Somme department in Hauts-de-France in northern France.

Geography

Etymology
 Buire : Of Celtic origin, meaning 'a slope', Buire has been successively Buracum and Buiciera.
 Courcelles Also of Celtic origin, meaning a group of houses. This hamlet was a commune before the French revolution and attached to Buire in 1794.

Population

See also
Communes of the Somme department

References

Communes of Somme (department)
1794 establishments in France